In enzymology, a beta-apiosyl-beta-glucosidase is an enzyme that catalyzes the chemical reaction

7-[beta-D-apiofuranosyl-(1->6)-beta-D-glucopyranosyloxy]isoflavonoid + H2O  a 7-hydroxyisoflavonoid + beta-D-apiofuranosyl-(1->6)-D-glucose

The 3 substrates of this enzyme are [[7-[beta-D-apiofuranosyl-(1->6)-beta-D-]], [[glucopyranosyloxy]isoflavonoid]], and H2O, whereas its two products are 7-hydroxyisoflavonoid and [[beta-D-apiofuranosyl-(1->6)-D-glucose]].

This enzyme belongs to the family of hydrolases, specifically those glycosidases that hydrolyse O- and S-glycosyl compounds.  The systematic name of this enzyme class is 7-[beta-D-apiofuranosyl-(1->6)-beta-D-glucopyranosyloxy]isoflavonoid beta-D-apiofuranosyl-(1->6)-D-glucohydrolase. Other names in common use include isoflavonoid-7-O-beta[D-apiosyl-(1->6)-beta-D-glucoside], disaccharidase, isoflavonoid 7-O-beta-apiosyl-glucoside beta-glucosidase, and furcatin hydrolase.

References

 
 
 

EC 3.2.1
Enzymes of unknown structure